Archibald William Symington (March 1892 – 8 May 1941) was a Scottish international rugby union player, who was killed in World War II.

He also played for Cambridge University RFC.

See also
 List of Scottish rugby union players killed in World War II

Sources
 Bath, Richard (ed.) The Scotland Rugby Miscellany (Vision Sports Publishing Ltd, 2007 )
 Massie, Allan A Portrait of Scottish Rugby (Polygon, Edinburgh)

References

External links
 Player profile on scrum.com

1892 births
1941 deaths
Cambridge University R.U.F.C. players
Royal Air Force personnel killed in World War II
Royal Air Force squadron leaders
Scotland international rugby union players
Scottish rugby union players
Rugby union locks
Scottish military personnel